Les Maris, les Femmes, les Amants is a 1989 French comedy drama film directed by Pascal Thomas.

Plot
On the Ile de Re, during the summer holidays, husbands alone occupy their children while their wives remained in Paris

Cast

 Jean-François Stévenin as Martin
 Susan Moncur as Dora
 Clément Thomas as Clément
 Emilie Thomas as Emilie
 Michel Robin as Tocanier
 Catherine Jacob as Marie-Françoise Tocanier
 Daniel Ceccaldi as Jacques
 Anne Guinou as Jacqueline
 Pierre Jean as Michel
 Damien Morel as Stef
 Ludivine Sagnier as Elodie
 Guy Marchand as Bruno
 Hélène Vincent as Odette
 Alexandra London as Brigitte
 Leslie Azzoulai as Chantal
 Catherine Bidaut as Annette
 Sabine Haudepin as Barbie
 Éric Lartigau as Guillaume
 Vanessa Guedj as Eleonore
 Olga Vincent as Olga
 Christiane Millet as Claire
 Danielle Gaudry as Kiki
 Héléna Manson as Dentist's mother
 Isabelle Petit-Jean as Pichard's widow

References

External links

1989 films
1980s French-language films
French comedy-drama films
Films directed by Pascal Thomas
1989 comedy-drama films
1989 comedy films
1989 drama films
1980s French films